{{Album ratings
|rev1 = AllMusic
|rev1score = 
|rev2 = Punktastic
|rev2score = 
|rev3 = Rock Sound
|rev3score = 
|rev4 = Sputnikmusic
|rev4score = 
|rev5 = 'Daily Dischord|rev5score = 
}}Scatterbrain'' is the second album from Scottish band The Xcerts which was released on 4 October 2010.

Track listing

Personnel
 Murray Macleod – guitar, vocals
 Jordan Smith – bass guitar, vocals, piano
 Tom Heron – drums, percussion, vocals

Mike Sapone - Production

References

2010 albums
The Xcerts albums
Xtra Mile Recordings albums
Albums produced by Mike Sapone